Kwame Steede (born 4 July 1980) is a Bermudian football coach and former player. He was appointed head coach of the Devonshire Cougars in 2015.

Club career
Next to spending his entire local league career at Devonshire Cougars, Steede had played for Bermuda Hogges in the USL Premier Development League, as a midfielder.

International career
He made his debut for Bermuda in a December 2003 friendly match against Barbados and earned a total of 21 caps, scoring 6 goals. He has represented his country in 8 FIFA World Cup qualification matches.

Managerial career
Steede was named head coach of Devonshire Cougars in summer 2015, succeeding Andrew Bascome.

References

1980 births
Living people
Association football midfielders
Bermudian footballers
Bermuda international footballers
Bermuda Hogges F.C. players
USL Second Division players
USL League Two players
Bermudian football managers